Mazyad Freeh Al-Enezi (born 6 July 1989) is a Saudi professional footballer who plays as a goalkeeper for Saudi club Al-Qadsiah.

Career
On 4 July 2022, Freeh joined First Division side Al-Jabalain. He departed Al-Batin after spending eleven years playing at the club. On 29 January 2023, Freeh joined Al-Qadsiah.

Honours
Al-Batin
First Division/MS League: 2019–20, runner-up 2015–16

External links

References

1989 births
Living people
Saudi Arabian footballers
Al Batin FC players
Al-Jabalain FC players
Al-Qadsiah FC players
Saudi First Division League players
Saudi Professional League players
Saudi Second Division players
Association football goalkeepers